Thando Hopa (born 1989 in Sebokeng) is a South African model, activist, and lawyer. She is the first woman with albinism to be on the cover of Vogue. While working as a prosecutor, she was scouted by Gert-Johan Coetzee to work as a model. Hopa aims to portray albinism in a positive way. She was cast as the Princess of Hearts in the 2018 Pirelli Calendar, becoming the first South African person of color to appear in it. In 2018, Hopa was recognized with the 100 Women award from BBC for her diversity and inclusion advocacy.

Thando was cast as Artemis in the British-American miniseries, Troy: Fall of a City.

She formed part of the panel of judges for Miss South Africa, which culminated in the win of Miss Universe Zozibini Tunzi.

In 2020, she became a fellow at the World Economic Forum, narratives lab and she was mentored by singer-songwriter, actress and activist Angélique Kidjo.

See also 

 Albinism in popular culture

References 

Living people
1989 births
South African female models
People with albinism
BBC 100 Women
21st-century South African lawyers
South African women lawyers
21st-century South African women
South African women activists
South African activists
21st-century women lawyers